The Owen G. Glenn Building is the home of the Business School of the University of Auckland, Auckland, New Zealand, completed in late 2007. It is named after Owen G. Glenn ONZM, an expatriate New Zealand businessman who has donated to a number of philanthropic causes, as well as giving NZ$7.5 million to the business school.

The building has 11 levels to serve the teaching and research activities of the school, and has been described as being "a series of layered sinuous blades anchored by a central atrium."

The lowest levels feature teaching, learning and administrative spaces, while the higher floors contain offices for 287 staff, 80% of whom have individual offices. The basement of the building contains 1000 parking spaces.

References 

Buildings and structures in Auckland
Business schools in New Zealand
Buildings and structures of the University of Auckland
School buildings completed in 2007
2000s architecture in New Zealand
2007 establishments in New Zealand
Auckland CBD